The coffinfish or  furry coffinfish (Chaunax endeavouri) is a species of sea toad of the family Chaunacidae. It is found in salty temperate waters of southwestern Pacific, off east coast of Australia. The coffinfish was first discovered around February 1997 in Sicily, Italy by the skipper of the Libra, which was a trawler who was harbored in Mazara at the time. Deep sea crab fishermen off the east coast of Florida pull them up from depth ranging from 5,000–8,000 feet about 54–68 miles off the coast.

Distribution
Endemic to the temperate waters of the southwestern Pacific, off east coast of Australia.

Habitat
Benthic, muddy bottom of the ocean, Australian continental shelf and upper slope in the deep ocean, usually 200m–2500m.

The Indian Ocean also has two different types of coffinfish residing in its deep waters: Chaunax nebulosus and Chaunax africanus. They differ in color due to different markings on dorsal parts. C. nebolosus has green spots and black markings, while C. africanus has long narrow brown bars.

Physical description
Rounded body and ventrally compressed with loose skin; tapering to a small rounded tail. Head very large and globose with especially prominent open lateral-line canals; eyes dorsolateral; the mouth is large, oblique to nearly vertical, with relatively small, sharp slender teeth. Lure is short, located just behind snout within a depression that it rests in; the esca is mop-like, a dense cluster of numerous, short, thread-like cirri. The skin is densely covered with small to minute spine-like scales that are somewhat similar both in shape and feel to placoid scales of sharks. Single open lateral-line canal on body joining conspicuous canals on head and extending posteriorly to proximal portion of caudal fin. Anal-fin rays 6 or 7 (usually 7); Soft dorsal fin with 10 to 12 rays; pectoral fins narrow and paddle-like, with 10 to 15 soft rays; greatest distance between anterolateral angles of sphenotic bones is 15 to 23% of the standard length. 10 to 13 Neuromasts in a supraorbital row, 2 to 4 neuromasts in the upper pre-opercular row, 3 to 5 neuromasts in the lower pre-opercular row, 10 to 13 in pectoral row, 29 to 42 in lateral line. The color of C. endeavouri is generally pink, reddish, orange, or rose-colored; some with pale diffuse spots of yellow or olive green.

Reproduction and development 
C. endeavouri lays eggs in buoyant mucous ribbon-like “rafts”. These buoyant rafts are an excellent device for broadcasting a large number of small eggs over great geographic distances providing for development in relatively productive surface waters.

After hatching, the larvae swim to the surface and feed on plankton. As they mature, they return to the depths below. The morphology of the larval stage seems to reflect an adaptation to a long larval life. The larvae are translucent, round and found in the pelagic zone, unlike the benthic, dorsoventrally compressed adults.

Behavior 
C. endeavouri has inflatable gills that it uses to fill its body with water, acting as a defense mechanism much like the pufferfish. When the gill chambers are completely filled with water, there is no inhalation or exhalation for 26 to 245 seconds. This is beneficial for energy preservation. The body of the C. endeavouri will increase in volume by 30% with full gill chambers and will protect it against predators.

Food Habits 
Adults are ambush predators that use small lures above their snouts to attract small, invertebrate crustaceans to their mouths. Little is known about the diet of larval and juvenile C. endeavouri, but they likely eat plankton during their pelagic stage. They also like to eat shrimps and other fish. They are also a source of food for many other bug sea creatures. (Ho, Two new species of the coffinfish genus Chaunax (Lophiiformes: Chaunacidae) from the Indian Ocean)

Perception 
A very large number of lateral line canals allow the C. endeavouri to detect movement in their surroundings as they often live in low-visibility areas. This is especially beneficial as an ambush predator.

Predation 
There is evidence suggesting that various kinds of anglerfish – including large species – are consumed by larger predatory fishes such as sharks.

Ecosystem roles 
The C. endeavouri is a deep ocean, benthic predator of small crustaceans, like Acanthomysis microps, a deep sea shrimp. And predated by deep sea piscivores like cow sharks.

Economic importance 
Chaunax have been bycatch for deep sea trawlers.

Conservation 
C. endeavouri was categorized as “High Risk” from oceanic trawlers in an Ecological Risk Assessment by the Australian Fisheries Management Authority due to their high susceptibility to trawlers (Being benthic) and relatively low productivity. However, they are non-threatened due to their wide area of distribution.

References

Chaunacidae
Fish of the Indian Ocean
Fish of the Pacific Ocean
Marine fish of Australia
Endemic fauna of Australia
Taxa named by Gilbert Percy Whitley
Fish described in 1929